Trichocentrum fuscum, commonly known as the dark trichocentrum, is a species of orchid found from Mexico to Central America.

External links 

fuscum
Orchids of Mexico
Orchids of Central America